The 1945 Dunedin North by-election was a by-election held during the 27th New Zealand Parliament in the Dunedin electorate of Dunedin North. The by-election occurred following the death of MP James W. Munro and was won by Robert Walls.

Background
This triggered the Dunedin North by-election, which was contested by Robert Walls for Labour, and Norman Jones for National. Walls obtained 53.1% of the votes and was successful. Walls represented Dunedin North until his death in 1953, and the Labour Party would go on to hold the electorate until 1975.

There was talk of John A. Lee standing as a Democratic Labour (DLP) candidate as soon as the seat fell vacant, though no nomination either on his behalf or another DLP candidate was received before nominations closed.

It was the first time that Jones contested an election; he contested six more elections unsuccessfully before he was finally successful in the  electorate 30 years later.

The by-election was held soon after the 1945 Hamilton by-election, when National had campaigned on withdrawing New Zealand troops from Italy and restricting New Zealand's role in the Pacific War to food supply, though Labour wanted to keep New Zealand troops in the Pacific to "have a say" in the peace. But Peter Fraser wanted to contribute to a Commonwealth force against Japan. He met the Opposition leaders Sidney Holland and Adam Hamilton; noting the divisions in his own caucus. Holland agreed with Fraser not to refer to the matter (which was agitating the whole country) during the campaign. The government held the seat, and in a (non-broadcast) semi-secret session of the House on 2 August agreed to participate in a force against Japan "within the capacity of our remaining resources of manpower". And National's proposal to reduce the total armed forces to 55,000 was accepted.

Previous election

Results
The following table gives the election results:

See also
List of New Zealand by-elections
1922 Dunedin North by-election
1953 North Dunedin by-election

Notes

References

Politics of Dunedin
1945 elections in New Zealand
Dunedin
1940s in Dunedin
July 1945 events in New Zealand